Elephantida is a group that contains the elephants as well as their extinct relatives, the gomphotheres and the stegodontids. The following cladogram shows the relationships among elephantidans, based on hyoid characteristics:

References